Greenland Group Suzhou Center is a supertall skyscraper under construction in Suzhou, China by the Greenland Group. Construction started in 2014 and will be completed in 2023.

See also
List of tallest buildings in China

References

Buildings and structures under construction in China
Skyscrapers in Suzhou